Carl Marotte (born February 25, 1959) is a Canadian actor from Montreal, Quebec. He is a 1979 graduate of Dawson College's Professional Theatre Program  and has received a Gemini Award nomination for his role in the television movie Net Worth as Marty Pavelich.

Career 
Marotte's other work includes roles in Lance et Compte, a leading role in Beyond Reality as J.J. Stillman, Street Legal, At the End of the Day: The Sue Rodriguez Story as David Rodriguez, Wind at My Back as Luc Gerrard, Fortier as Me. Jacques Savaria, Challenger: Countdown to Disaster as Steven McAuliffe, and Joe in Twists of Terror. In 1984, he also co-starred alongside Keanu Reeves in a homoerotic Canadian play, Wolfboy.

Filmography

Film

Television

References

External links
 

1959 births
Living people
Canadian male film actors
Canadian male television actors
Male actors from Quebec
People from Trois-Rivières